Settime is a comune (municipality) in the Province of Asti in the Italian region Piedmont, located about  southeast of Turin and about  northwest of Asti.

Settime borders the following municipalities: Asti, Chiusano d'Asti, and Cinaglio.

Demographic evolution

References

External links
 www.comune.settime.at.it

Cities and towns in Piedmont